Constructive set theory is an approach to mathematical constructivism following the program of axiomatic set theory.
The same first-order language with "" and "" of classical set theory is usually used, so this is not to be confused with a constructive types approach.
On the other hand, some constructive theories are indeed motivated by their interpretability in type theories.

In addition to rejecting the principle of excluded middle, constructive set theories often require some logical quantifiers in their axioms to be set bounded, motivated by results tied to impredicativity.

Introduction

Constructive outlook

Use of intuitionistic logic 
The logic of the set theories discussed here is constructive in that it rejects the principle of excluded middle , i.e. that the disjunction  automatically holds for all propositions . As a rule, to prove the excluded middle for a proposition , i.e. to prove the particular disjunction , either  or  needs to be explicitly proven. When either such proof is established, one says the proposition is decidable, and this then logically implies the disjunction holds. In contrast, axiomatic theories deemed constructive tend to not permit many classical proofs of statements involving properties that are provenly computationally undecidable. Similarly, a counter-example existence claim  is generally constructively stronger than a rejection claim : Exemplifying a  such that  is contradictory of course means it is not the case that  holds for all possible . But one may also demonstrate that  holding for all  would logically lead to a contradiction without the aid of a specific counter-example, and even while not being able to construct one. In the latter case, constructively, here one does not stipulate an existence claim.

The intuitionistic logic underlying the set theories discussed here, unlike the more conservative minimal logic, still permits double negation elimination for individual propositions for which excluded middle holds. In turn the theorem formulations regarding finite objects tends to not differ from their classical counterparts. Given a model of all natural numbers, the equivalent for predicates, namely Markov's principle, does not automatically hold, but may be considered as an additional principle.

So in words, intuitionistic logic still posits: It is impossible to rule out a proposition and rule out its negation both at once, and thus the rejection of any instantiated excluded middle statement for an individual proposition is inconsistent. Here the double-negation captures that the disjunction statement now provenly can never be ruled out or rejected, even in cases where the disjunction may not be provable (for example, by demonstrating one of the disjuncts, thus deciding ) from the assumed axioms. More generally, constructive mathematical theories tend to prove classically equivalent reformulations of classical theorems. For example, in constructive analysis, one cannot prove the intermediate value theorem in its textbook formulation, but one can prove theorems with algorithmic content that, as soon as double negation elimination and its consequences are assumed legal, are at once classically equivalent to the classical statement. The difference is that the constructive proofs are harder to find.

Imposed restrictions 
A restriction to the constructive reading of existence apriori leads to stricter requirements regarding which characterizations of a set  involving unbounded collections constitute a (mathematical, and so always meaning total) function. This is often because the predicate in a case-wise would-be definition may not be decidable. Compared to the classical counterpart, one is generally less likely to prove the existence of relations that cannot be realized. Adopting the standard definition of set equality via extensionality, the full Axiom of Choice is such a non-constructive principle that implies  for the formulas permitted in one's adopted Separation schema, by Diaconescu's theorem. Similar results hold for the Axiom of Regularity in its standard form, as shown below. So the development of a genuinely intuitionistic set theory also requires reconsideration of choice principles and the rewording of some standard axioms to classically equivalent ones. Undecidability of disjunctions also affects the claims about total orders such as that of all ordinal numbers, expressed by the provability and rejection of the clauses in the order defining disjunction . This determines whether the relation is trichotomous.

Metalogic 
A weakened theory of ordinals in turn affects the proof theoretic strength defined in ordinal analysis. And apart from reservations regrading of impredicativity as well as computability, technical question regarding which non-logical axioms effectively extend the underlying logic of a theory is also a research subject in its own right.

In exchange, constructive set theories can exhibit attractive disjunction and existence properties, as is familiar from the study of constructive arithmetic theories. These are features of a fixed theory which metalogically relate judgements of propositions provable in the theory. Particularly well-studied are those such features that can be expressed in Heyting arithmetic, with quantifiers over numbers and which can often be realized by numerals, as formalized in proof theory. In particular, those are the numerical existence property and the closely related disjunctive property, as well as being closed under Church's rule, witnessing any given function to be computable.

A set theory does not only express theorems about numbers, and so one may consider a more general so-called strong existence property that is harder to come by, as will be discussed. A theory has this property if the following can be established: For any property , if the theory proves that a set exist that has that property, i.e. if the theory claims the existence statement, then there is also a property  that uniquely describes such a set instance. More formally, for any predicate  there is a predicate  so that

The role analogous to that of realized numerals in arithmetic is played here by defined sets proven to exist according to the theory, and so this is a subtle question concerning term construction and the theories strength. While many theories discussed tend have all the various numerical properties, the existence property can easily be spoiled, as will be discussed. Weaker forms of existence properties have been formulated.

Some classical theories can in fact also be constrained so as to exhibit the strong existence property. For contrast, consider the theory  given by  plus the full axiom of choice existence postulate. Recall that this collection of axioms proves the well-ordering theorem, implying well-orderings exists for any set. The latter implies that for no particular formula  in the language of the theory does the theory prove that the corresponding set is a well-ordering relation of the reals. So  formally proves the existence of a subset  with the property of being a well-ordering relation, but at the same time no particular set  for which the property could be validated can possibly be defined.

Anti-classical principles 
When adopting such a schema as an inference rule and nothing new can be proven, one says the theory  is closed under that rule.
That is to say, to postulate that any such  implies  such that  holds, where the bound  is a number variable in language of the theory. The new theory with the principle added might be anti-classical, in that it may not be consistent anymore to also adopt .

The focus in this subsection shall be on set theories with quantification over a fully formal notion of an infinite sequences space, i.e. function space, as it will be introduced further below.
A translation of Church's rule into the language of the theory itself may then read

Kleene's T predicate together with the result extraction expresses that any input number  being mapped to the number  is, through , witnessed to be a computable mapping. Stronger variants have been used, which extend this principle to functions  defined on domains  of low complexity. Weaker, double negated forms of the principle may be considered too, which do not require the existence of a recursive implementation for every , but which still make principles inconsistent that claim the existence of functions which provenly have no recursive realization. Some forms of a Church's thesis as principle are even consistent with the weak classical second order arithmetic .

The collection of computable functions is classically subcountable, which classically is the same as being countable. But classical set theories will generally claim that  holds also other functions than the computable ones. For example there is a proof in  that total functions (in the set theory sense) do exist that cannot be captured by a Turing machine.
Taking the computable world seriously as ontology, a prime example of an anti-classical conception related the Markovian school is the permitted subcountability of various uncountable collections. Adopting the subcountability of the collection of all unending sequences of natural numbers as an axiom in a constructive theory, the "smallness" (in classical terms) of this collection, in some set theoretical realizations, is then already captured by the theory itself.
A constructive theory may also adopt neither classical nor anti-classical axioms and so stay agnostic towards either possibility.

Constructive principles already prove  for any . Indeed, for any given , by noncontradiction it is impossible to rule out  and rule out its negation both at once. But a theory may in some instances also permit the rejection claim . Adopting this does not necessitate providing a particular  witnessing the failure of excluded middle for the particular proposition , i.e. witnessing the inconsistent .
As another example, such a situation is enforced in Brouwerian intuitionistic analysis, in a case where the quantifier ranges over infinitely many unending binary sequences and  states that a sequence  is everywhere zero. Concerning this property, of being conclusively identified as the sequence which is forever constant, adopting Brouwer's continuity principle rules out that this could be proven decidable for all the sequences.

So in a constructive context with a so-called non-classical logic as used here, one may consistently adopt axioms which are both in contradiction to quantified forms of excluded middle, but also non-constructive in the computable sense or as gauged by meta-logical existence properties discussed previously. In that way, a constructive set theory can also provide the framework to study non-classical theories.

History and overview 
In 1973, he had proposed the former as a first-order set theory based on intuitionistic logic, taking the most common foundation  and throwing out the Axiom of choice as well as the principle of the excluded middle, initially leaving everything else as is. However, different forms of some of the  axioms which are equivalent in the classical setting are inequivalent in the constructive setting, and some forms imply , as will be demonstrated. In those cases, the intuitionistically weaker formulations were consequently adopted. The far more conservative system  is also a first-order theory, but of several sorts and bounded quantification, aiming to provide a formal foundation for Errett Bishop's program of constructive mathematics.

Many modern results trace back to Rathjen and his students.
 is also characterized by the two features present also in Myhill's theory:
On the one hand, it is using the Predicative Separation instead of the full, unbounded Separation schema, see also Lévy hierarchy.
Boundedness can be handled as a syntactic property or, alternatively, the theories can be conservatively extended with a higher boundedness predicate and its axioms. Secondly, the impredicative Powerset axiom is discarded, generally in favor of related but weaker axioms. The strong form is very casually used in classical general topology.
Adding  to a theory even weaker than  recovers , as detailed below.
The system, which has come to be known as Intuitionistic Zermelo–Fraenkel set theory, is a strong set theory without .

Models 
As far as constructive realizations go there is a relevant realizability theory. Relatedly, Aczel's theory constructive Zermelo-Fraenkel  has been interpreted in a Martin-Löf type theories, as described below.

For a set theory context without infinite sets, constructive first-order arithmetic can also be taken as an apology for most axioms adopted in : The arithmetic theory  is bi-interpretable with a weak constructive set theory, as also described in the article on Heyting arithmetic. One may arithmetically characterize a membership relation "" and with it prove - instead of the existence of a set of natural numbers  - that all sets in its theory are in bijection with a (finite) von Neumann natural, a principle denoted . This context further validates Extensionality, Pairing, Union, Binary Intersection (which is related to the Axiom schema of predicative separation) and the Set Induction schema. Taken as axioms, the aforementioned principles constitute a set theory that is already identical with the theory given by  minus the existence of  but plus  as axiom. All those axioms are discussed in detail below.
Relatedly,  also proves that the hereditarily finite sets fulfill all the previous axioms.

Many theories studied in constructive set theory are mere restrictions of Zermelo–Fraenkel set theory with respect to their axiom as well as their underlying logic.

More recently, presheaf models for constructive set theories have been introduced. These are analogous to presheaf models for intuitionistic set theory developed by Dana Scott in the 1980s.

Subtheories of ZF

Notation

Language 
The propositional connective symbols used to form syntactic formulas are standard. The axioms of set theory give a means to prove equality "" of sets and that symbol may, by abuse of notation, be used for classes. Negation "" of elementhood "" is often written "", and usually the same goes for non-equality "", although in constructive mathematics the latter symbol is also used in the context with apartness relations.

Variables 
The word "predicate" is sometimes used interchangeably with "formulas" as well, even in the unary case.

Quantifiers range over sets and those are denoted by lower case letters.
As is common, one may use argument brackets to express predicates, for the sake of highlighting particular free variables in their syntactic expression, as in "".

The syntactic notion of bounded quantification in this sense can play a role in the formulation of axiom schemas, as seen below.

Express the subclass claim , i.e.

Unique existence  here means .

If there provenly exists a set inside a class, meaning , then one calls it inhabited. The class  is then provenly not the empty set, introduced below. While classically equivalent, constructively non-empty is a weaker notion with two negations. Unfortunately, the word for the more useful notion of 'inhabited' is rarely used in classical mathematics.

Classes 
As is also common in the study of set theories, one makes use set builder notation for classes, which, in most contexts, are not part of the object language but used for concise discussion. Logically equivalent predicates can be used to introduce the same class.
For a predicate , trivially . And so follows that .

Through the use of a 2-ary predicate , a set  may be characterized as  holding for all , where the right hand side may depend on the actual variable , and possibly even on membership in  itself.

Equality
Denote by  the statement expressing that two classes have exactly the same elements, i.e. , or equivalently . This is not to be conflated with the concept of equinumerosity.

By the logical properties of equality, the converse direction holds automatically.

And (unless the whole disjunction follows from axioms) in the Brouwer–Heyting–Kolmogorov interpretation, this means to have proven  or having rejected it.

Consider a predicate  that provenly holds for all elements of a set , so that , and assume that the class on the left hand side is established to be a set. While often adopted, this axiom has been criticized in constructive thought, as it effectively collapses differently defined properties, or at least the sets viewed as the extension of these properties, a Fregian notion.

Modern type theories may instead aim at defining the demanded equivalence "" in terms of functions, see e.g. type equivalence. The related concept of function extensionality is often not adopted in type theory.

Other frameworks for constructive mathematics might instead demand a particular rule for equality or apartness come for the elements  of each and every set  discussed.
Note that adopting "" as a symbol in a predicate logic theory makes equality of two terms a quantifier-free expression.

Merging sets
Two other basic axioms are as follows. Firstly,

And then,

saying that for any set , there is at least one set , which holds all members , of 's members .

The two axioms may also be formulated stronger in terms of "".

Define class notation for a few given elements via disjunctions, e.g.  says .
Denote by  the standard ordered pair model .

Set existence
That the empty class is a set readily follows from other axioms, such as the Axiom of Infinity below. But if, e.g., one is explicitly interested in excluding infinite sets in one's study, one may at this point adopt the

This axiom would also readily be accepted, but is not relevant in the context of stronger axioms below. Introduction of the symbol  (as abbreviating notation for expressions in involving characterizing properties) is justified as uniqueness for this set can be proven. As explained, not being empty is constructively a different notion than being inhabited.

It is relevant for the standard modeling of individual Neumann ordinals. Its interplay with the membership relation has a recursive clause, in the sense that . By reflexivity of equality, .
A sort of blend between pairing and union, an axiom more readily related to the successor is the Axiom of adjunction.

Accompanied by a metamathematical analysis that the capabilities of the new theories are equivalent in an effective manner, formal extensions by symbols such as  may also be considered.

BCST 
The following makes use of axiom schemas, i.e. axioms for some collection of predicates.
Some of the stated axiom schemas shall allow for any collection of set parameters as well (meaning any particular named variables ). That is, instantiations of the schema are permitted in which the predicate (some particular ) also depends on a number of further set variables and the statement of the axiom is understood with corresponding extra outer universal closures (as in ).

Separation 
Basic constructive set theory  consists of several axioms also part of standard set theory, except the Separation axiom is weakened.
Beyond the four axioms above, it the Predicative Separation as well as the Replacement schema.

This axiom amounts to postulating the existence of a set  obtained by the intersection of any set  and any predicatively described class .
Intersection corresponds to conjunction in an analog way to how union corresponds to disjunction.

As noted, from Separation and the existence of at least one set (e.g. Infinity below) and a predicate that is false of any set, like , will follow the existence of the empty set  (also denoted ).
The latter variant of axiomatization does not make use of a formula schema.

For a proposition , a recurring trope in the constructive analysis of set theory is to view the predicate  as the subclass  of the second ordinal . So in terms of this terminology, unsurprisingly, decidable propositions have binary truth values.

The axiom schema of Predicative Separation is also called Bounded Separation, as in Separation for set-bounded quantifiers only. The scope of specified subsets that can be proven to exist is enriched with further set existence postulate. Bounded Separation is a schema that takes into account syntactic aspects of predicates. (Note however that the arithmetic classification is sometimes expressed not syntactically but in terms of subclasses of the naturals. Also, the bottom level of the arithmetical hierarchy has several common definitions, some not allowing the use of some total functions. The distinction is not relevant on the level  or higher. Finally note that a  classification of a formula may be expressed up to equivalence in the theory.)

The schema is also the way in which Mac Lane weakens a system close to Zermelo set theory , for mathematical foundations related to topos theory. See also Kripke-Platek set theory.

No universal set 
The following holds for any relation , giving a purely logical condition by which two terms  and  non-relatable

The expression  is a bounded one and thus allowed in separation. By virtue of the rejection of the final disjunct above, Russel's construction shows that . In particular, no universal set can exist in this theory.
In a theory with the axiom of regularity, like , of course that subset  can be proven to be equal to  itself. As an aside, in a theory with stratification, a universal set may exist because use of the syntactic expression  may be disallowed in proofs of existence by, essentially, separation.

Predicativity 
The restriction in the axiom is also gatekeeping impredicative definitions: Existence should at best not be claimed for objects that are not explicitly describable, or whose definition involves themselves or reference to a proper class, such as when a property to be checked involves a universal quantifier.
,
or via a similar definitions involving any quantification over the sets . In other words, as the subclass property  is fulfilled, this exact set , defined using the expression , would play a role in its own characterization.

While predicative Separation leads to fewer given class definitions being sets, it must be emphasized that many class definitions that are classically equivalent are not so when restricting oneself to constructive logic. So in this way, one gets a broader theory, constructively.
Due to the potential undecidability of general predicates, the notion of subset and subclass is more elaborate in constructive set theories than in classical ones. This remains true if full Separation is adopted, as in the theory , which however spoils the existence property as well as the standard type theoretical interpretations, and in this way spoils a bottom-up view of constructive sets. As an aside, as subtyping is not a necessary feature of constructive type theory, constructive set theory can be said to quite differ from that framework.

Replacement 
Next consider the

It is granting existence, as sets, of the range of function-like predicates, obtained via their domains. In the above formulation, the predicate is not restricted akin to the Separation schema, but this axiom already involves an existential quantifier in the antecedent. Of course, weaker schemas could be considered as well.

With the Replacement schema, this theory proves that the equivalence classes or indexed sums are sets. In particular, the Cartesian product, holding all pairs of elements of two sets, is a set.

Replacement is not necessary in the design of a weak constructive set theory that is bi-interpretable with Heyting arithmetic . However, some form of induction is. Replacement together with Set Induction (introduced below) also suffices to axiomize hereditarily finite sets constructively and that theory is also studied without Infinity. For comparison, consider the very weak classical theory called General set theory that interprets the class of natural numbers and their arithmetic via just Extensionality, Adjunction and full Separation.

Replacement can be seen as a form of comprehension. Only when assuming  does Replacement already imply full Separation. In , Replacement is mostly important to prove the existence of sets of high rank, namely via instances of the axiom schema where  relates relatively small set  to bigger ones, .

Constructive set theories commonly have Axiom schema of Replacement, sometimes restricted to bounded formulas. However, when other axioms are dropped, this schema is actually often strengthened - not beyond , but instead merely to gain back some provability strength. Such stronger axioms exist that do not spoil the strong existence properties of a theory, as discussed further below.

The discussion now proceeds with axioms granting existence of objects which, in different but related form, are also found in dependent type theories, namely products and the collection of natural numbers as a completed set. Infinite sets are particularly handy to reason about operations applied to functions defined on infinite domains.

ECST 
For some fixed predicate  and a set , the statement  expresses that  is the smallest (in the sense of "") among all sets  for which  holds true, and that it is always a subset of such . The aim of the axiom of infinity is to eventually obtain unique smallest inductive set.

In the context of common set theory axioms, one statement of infinitude is to state that a class is inhabited and also includes a chain of membership (or alternatively a chain of supersets). That is,
.
More concretely, denote by  the inductive property,
.

Write  for the general intersection . One commonly defines a class , the intersection of all inductive sets. It exactly holds all  fulfilling . The intention is that if inductive sets exist at all, then the class  shares each common natural number with them, and then the proposition , by definition of "", implies that  holds for each of these naturals. While bounded separation does not suffice to prove  to be the desired set, the language here forms the basis for the following axiom, granting natural number induction for predicates that constitute a set.

One takes  to denote the now unique smallest inductive set, the infinite von Neumann ordinal. Symbols called zero and successor are in the signature of the theory of Peano. In , the above defined successor of any number also being in the class  follow directly from the characterization of the natural naturals by our von Neumann model. Since the successor of such a set contains itself, one also finds that no successor equals zero. So two of the Peano axioms regarding the symbols zero and the one regarding closedness of  come easily.

The pairwise order "" on the naturals is captured by their membership relation "". It is important to note that the theory proves the order as well as the equality relation on this set to be decidable.

Weaker formulations of infinity 
Should it need motivation, the handyness of postulating an infinite set of numbers in relation to other inductive properties becomes clear in the discussion of arithmetic in set theory further below. But as is familiar from classical set theory, also weak forms of Infinity can be formulated. For example, one may just postulate the existence of some inductive set,  - such an existence postulate suffices when full Separation may then be used to carve out the inductive subset  of natural numbers, the shared subset of all inductive classes. Alternatively, more specific mere existence postulates may be adopted. Either which way, the inductive set then fulfills the following  predecessor existence property in the sense of the von Neumann model:

Observe that through the expression "" on the right hand side, the property characterizing  by its members  here syntactically again contains the symbol  itself. Due to the bottom-up nature of the natural numbers, this is tame here. Assuming -set induction, no two sets have this property.
Also note that there are also longer formulations of this property, avoiding "" in favor unbounded quantifiers.

Number bounds 
Adopting an axiom of infinity, the set-bounded quantification legal in predicates used in </math>\Delta_0</math>-Separation then explicitly permits numerically unbounded quantifiers - the two meanings of "bounded" should not be confused.

With  at hand, for a class of numbers , the statement

or the contrapositive variant

are statements of finiteness. For decidable properties, these are -statements in arithmetic, but with the axiom of Infinity, the two quantifiers are set-bound. Denote an initial segment of the natural numbers, i.e.

for any  and including the empty set, by
.
This set equals  and so at this point "" is mere notation for its predecessor (i.e. not involving subtraction function).
To reflect more closely the discussion of functions below, write the above condition as
.
Now for a general set, to be finitely enumerable shall mean that there is a surjection from a von Neumann natural number onto it, which is a function existence claim. Further, to be finite means there is a bijective function to a natural. To be subfinite means to be a subset of a finite set.

Terminology for conditions of finiteness and infinitude vary with authors and there are many more related definitions. Observe, for example, that , unlike any of its members, is in one-to-one correspondence with its proper subset .

For a class , the statement

is now also one of infinitude. But more generally, call a set infinite if one can inject  into it, which is again a function existence claim.

It is appropriate to discuss the function concept at this point.

Functions

General notes on functions 
Naturally, the logical meaning of existence claims is a topic of interest in intuitionistic logic, be it for a theory of sets or any other mathematical framework. A constructive proof calculus may validate statements as above,
,
in terms of programs on represented domains. Consider for example the notions of proof through type- or  realizability theory. Roughly, the task then is to provide a mapping  and witness the rewriting .

It is a theorem that already Robinson arithmetic  represents exactly the recursive functions in terms of particular predicates , which are then also proven total functional,
.
The weak classical arithmetic theory  postulates, instead of using the full mathematical induction schema for arithmetic formulas, that every number is either zero or that there exists a predecessor number to it.

Finally, beware of a common ambiguity in related texts on recursion theory, where "function" needs to be understood in the computable sense, which is generally narrower than what is discussed further below. Similarly, below there is also no need to speak of "total functions", as this is part of the definition of a set theoretical function.

Total functional relations 
Now in the current set theoretical approach, speak of a function when  and provenly
.
Notably, this definition involves quantifier explicitly asking for existence - an aspect which is particularly important in the constructive context. In words: For every , it demands the unique existence of a  so that . In the case that this holds so that  is a function, one may use function application bracket notation and write .

So one studies sets capturing particular total relations. Whether a subclass can be judged to be a function will depend on the strength of the theory, which is to say the axioms one adopts.
If the domain is a set, then the function has a pair for each of its elements and so the mapping information exists as set.
If domain and codomain are sets, then the above predicate only involves bounded quantifiers.

Let  (also written ) denote the class of sets that fulfill the function property. When functions are understood as just function graphs as above, the membership proposition  is also written .

The axiom scheme of Replacement can also be formulated in terms of the ranges of such set functions.
It is a metatheorem for theories containing  that adding a function symbol for a provenly total class function is a conservative extension, despite this changing the scope of bounded Separation.

Common notions such as surjectivity and injectivity can be expressed in a bounded fashion as well. Note that injectivity shall be defined positively, not by its contrapositive, which is common practice in classical mathematics. Injection existence provides a non-strict ordering of two sets, capturing one notion of size. A power class does not inject into its underlying set.

Separation lets us cut out subsets of products , at least when they are described in a bounded fashion. Given any , one is now led to reason about classes such as

The boolean-valued characteristic functions  are among such classes. But be aware that  may in generally not be decidable. That is to say, in absence of any non-constructive axioms, the disjunction  may not be provable, since one requires an explicit proof of either disjunct. Constructively, when  cannot be witnessed for all , or uniqueness of the terms  associated with each  cannot be proven, then one cannot judge the comprehended collection to be total functional.
Case in point: The classical derivation of Schröder–Bernstein relies on case analysis - but to constitute a function, particular cases shall actually be specifiable, given any input from the domain. So to the extent that intuitionistic inference does not go beyond what is formalized here, there is no generic construction of a bijection from two injections in opposing directions.

Variants of the functional predicate definition using apartness relations on setoids have been defined as well. A function will always be a set if its range is. Care must be taken with nomenclature "function", which sees use in most mathematical frameworks, also because some tie a function term itself to a particular codomain.

Computable sets 
Given any predicate  on numbers (say one defined from Kleene's T predicate), let . Given any natural , then
.
There, one can obtain a bijective function. In this way, the class of functions in typical classical set theories is provenly rich, as it also contains objects that are beyond what we know to be effectively computable, or programmatically listable in praxis.

In computability theory, the computable sets are ranges of non-decreasing total functions in the recursive sense, at the level  of the arithmetical hierarchy, and not higher. Deciding a predicate at that level amounts to solving the task of eventually finding a certificate that either validates or rejects membership.
As not every predicate  is computably decidable, the theory  alone will not claim (prove) that all infinite  are the range of some bijective function with domain . See also Kripke's schema.

Applications may be found in the common models for claims about probability, e.g. statements involving the notion of "being given" an unending random sequence of coin flips.

Choice functions 
Choice principles postulate the existence of functions. These can then be translated to claims of existence of inverses, ordering, and so on. Choice moreover implies statements about cardinalities of different sets, e.g. they imply or rule out countability of sets.

Recall that not even classical  (without countable choice) proves each union of a countable set of pairs to be countable again. The naive proof strategy fails at accounting for infinitely many existential instantiations. Indeed, models of  have been defined that negate principles such as countable choice, which would imply this countability.

The constructive development here proceeds in a fashion agnostic to any discussed choice principles, but here are well studied variants:
 Kőnig's lemma: In a general form, this is related to the countability statement just noted. A classically provable form of it, is discussed in more detail below.
 Axiom of countable choice: If , one can form the one-to-many relation-set . The axiom of countable choice would grant that whenever , one can form a function mapping each number to a unique value. Countable choice can also be weakened further. Another means of weakening countable choice is by restricting the involved definitions w.r.t. their place in the syntactic hierarchies. Countable choice is not valid in the internal logic of a general topos, which can be seen as models of constructive set theories.
 Axiom of dependent choice: Countable choice is implied by the more general axiom of dependent choice, extracting a function from any entire relation on an inhabited set. Countable choice is akin to constructive Church's thesis principle and indeed dependent choice holds in many realizability models and it is thus adopted in many constructive schools.
 Relativized dependent choice: The stronger relativized dependent choice principle is a variant of it - a schema involving an extra predicate variable.
 -: A family of sets is better controllable if it comes indexed by a function. A set  is a base if all indexed families of sets  over it, have a choice function , i.e. . A collection of sets holding  and its elements and which is closed by taking indexed sums and products (see dependent type) is called -closed. While the axiom that all sets in the smallest -closed class are a base does need some work to formulate, it is the strongest principle over  that holds in the type theoretical interpretation .
 Axiom of choice: The choice function postulate concerning domains that are general sets containing inhabited sets, with the codomain given as their general union. It is typically formulated for all sets but has also been studied in classical formulations for sets only up to any particular cardinality. (The set  is the σ-algebra generated by the finite intervals . The axiom of choice also implies Dependent choice. Critically in the present context, it moreover also implies instances of  via Diaconescu's theorem. For theories extending  this means full choice at the very least proves  for all -formulas, a non-constructive consequence which may be acceptable from a predicativity standpoint, but not from computability standpoint.

Diaconescu's theorem
To highlight the strength of full Choice and its relation to matters of intentionality, one should consider the classes

from the proof of Diaconescu's theorem. Referring back to the introductory elaboration on the meaning of such convenient class notation, as well as to the principle of distributivity, . So validity of  means  and  share all members and there are two of them and indeed the equality is equivalent and decides . Similarly,  and, as provenly , one actually finds in which way the sets are then different. A contrapositive thus gives . All together, this gives equivalence of disjuncts
.

It is important that the elements  of the function's domain are different than the natural numbers  in that a priori less is known about the former. When forming then union of the two classes,  is a necessary but then also sufficient condition. Thus  and one is dealing with functions  into a set of two distinguishable values. With choice come the conjunction  in the codomain of the function. Using the distributivity, there arises a list of conditions on the possible function return values, a disjunction. Expanding what is then established, one finds that either both  as well as the sets equality, or that the return values are different and  can be rejected. The conclusion is that the choice postulate actually implies  whenever a Separation axiom allows for set comprehension using undecidable proposition .

Analysis of Diaconescu's theorem
So full choice is generally non-constructive. Equality defined by the set theoretical axiom of extensionality, which itself is not related to functions, in turn couples knowledge about the predicate to information about function values. On the other hand, witnessing  implies the two function arguments are not equal and this rules out . There are really only three combinations, as the axiom of extensionality in the given setup makes  inconsistent. So if the constructive reading of existence is to be preserved, full choice may be not adopted in the set theory, because the mere claim of function existence does not realize a particular function.

To better understand why we cannot expect to be granted a definitive (total) function, consider naive function candidates. So without further analysis, this would seem to make

a contender for a choice function. Indeed, if  can be rejected, this is the only option. So in that situation, a choice function would have type , for example

and this would rule out the initial contender. When considering the above functional assignment , then neither unconditionally declaring  nor  is necessarily consistent. As , postulating the classical  here would indeed imply that this is a choice function no matter which of two truth values  takes. And as in the constructive case, given a particular choice function - a set holding either exactly one or exactly two pairs - one could actually infer whether  or whether  does hold. Vice versa, the third and last candidate

This is a classical choice function either way as well. Constructively, the domain and values of such -dependent would-be functions will be undecidable and as such one fails to prove functional totality.
In computable interpretations, set theory axioms postulating (total) function existence lead to the requirement for halting recursive functions. From a function realization one can infer the branches taken by the "if-clauses" of the classical solutions, which were undecided in the interpreted theory. So extensional theories with full choice broadly tend to contradict the constructive Church's rule.

Regularity implies PEM
As opposed to the axiom of choice, this existence claim reaches for an element of every inhabited set, i.e. the "domain" are all inhabited sets. Its formulation does not involve a unique existence claim but instead guarantees a set with a specific property.
As the axiom correlates membership claims at different rank, the axiom also ends up implying :

The proof from choice above had used a particular set  from above. The proof in this paragraph also uses this , for which it was already established that .
Now let  be the postulated member with the empty intersection property, which in particular means . Together, one finds , which also formally decides .

Arithmetic 
The order "" of natural numbers is captured by membership "" in this von Neumann model and this set is discrete, i.e. also equality is decidable. Indeed, also
.
The first-order theory of Heyting arithmetic  has the same signature and non-logical axioms as Peano arithmetic. In contrast, the signature of set theory does not contain addition "" or multiplication "". Next, it is clarified which set theory axiom may be asserted to prove existence of the latter as a function set, together with their desired relation to zero and successor.

Recursion 
The set theory axioms listed so far suffice as formalized framework for a good portion of basic mathematics. Even without an induction principle for general classes, many universally quantified statements can still be proven per particular set term (e.g. some particular function). That said, the constructive set theory  does actually not even enable primitive recursion for function definitions of what would be  (where "" here denotes the Cartesian product of set, not to be confused with multiplication above). Indeed, despite having the Replacement axiom, the theory does not prove the addition function  to be a set function. This postulate is akin to the transfinite recursive theorem, except it is restricted to set functions and finite ordinals, i.e. there is no clause about limit ordinals. It functions as the set theoretical equivalent of a natural numbers object in category theory.
This then enables a full interpretation of Heyting arithmetic  in our set theory, including addition and multiplication functions.

With this, arithmetic of rational numbers  can then also be defined and its properties, like uniqueness and countability, be proven.

are sets.

Now conversely, a proof of the spelled out -model enabling iteration principle can be based on the collection of functions one would want to write as the union . The existence of this becomes provable when asserting that the individual function spaces  form sets themselves, which may be written as

Notably, adoption of such axioms has genuine set theoretical flavor, in contrast to a direct embedding arithmetic principles into our theory. It may further motivate the discussion of a stronger such exponentiation axiom below. This more set theoretical axiom will, however, still not prove the full induction schema for formulas with quantifiers over sets.

Moderate induction in ECST 
The second universally quantified conjunct in the strong axiom of Infinity expresses mathematical induction for all  in the universe of discourse, i.e. for sets. This is because sets  can be read as corresponding to predicates and the consequent  states that all  fulfill said predicate.

The much stronger axiom of full mathematical induction for any predicate expressed though set theory language could also be adopted at this point in our development. That induction principle follows from full (i.e. unbounded) Separation as well as from (full) Set induction.

Warning note: In naming induction statements, one must take care not to conflate terminology with arithmetic theories. The first-order induction schema of natural number arithmetic theory claims induction for all predicates definable in the language of first-order arithmetic, namely predicates of just numbers. In that context, the bounded quantification specifically means quantification over a finite range of numbers.
One may also speak about the induction in second-order arithmetic, explicitly expressed for subsets of the naturals. The class of subsets can be taken to correspond to a richer collection of formulas than the first-order arithmetic definable ones. Typical set theories like the one discussed here are also first-order, but those theories are not arithmetics and so formulas may also quantify over the subsets of the naturals. When discussing the strength of axioms concerning numbers, it is also important to keep in mind that the arithmetical and the set theoretical framework do not share a common signature. Likewise, care must always be taken with insights about totality of functions. In computability theory, the μ operator enables all partial general recursive functions (or programs, in the sense that they are Turing computable), including ones e.g. non-primitive recursive but -total, such as the Ackermann function. The definition of the operator involves predicates over the naturals and so the theoretical analysis of functions and their totality depends on the formal framework and proof calculus at hand.

In the program of reverse mathematics, all mathematical objects discussed are encoded as naturals or subsets of naturals. Second-order arithmetic theories with very low complexity comprehension have a language that does not merely express arithmetical sets, while all sets of naturals particular such theories prove to exist are just computable sets. Theorems therein can be a relevant reference point for weak set theories with a set of naturals, predicative separation and only some further restricted form of induction. Constructive reverse mathematics exists as a field but is less developed than its classical counterpart.

Induction without infinite sets 
The addition of numbers, considered as relation on triples, is an infinite collection, just like collection of natural numbers themselves. But note that induction schemas may be adopted (for sets, ordinals or in conjunction with a natural number sort), without ever postulating that the collection of naturals exists as a set. As noted, Heyting arithmetic  is bi-interpretable with such a constructive set theory, in which all sets are postulated to be in bijection with an ordinal. The BIT predicate is a common means to encode sets in arithmetic.

This paragraph lists a few weak natural number induction principles studied in the proof theory of arithmetic theories with addition and multiplication in their signature. This is the framework where these principles are most well understood. The theories may be defined via bounded formulations or variations on induction schemas that may furthermore only allow for predicates of restricted complexity. On the classical first-order side, this leads to theories between the Robinson arithmetic  and Peano arithmetic : The theory  does not have any induction.  has full mathematical induction for arithmetical formulas and has ordinal , meaning the theory lets one encode ordinals of weaker theories as recursive relation on just the naturals. Theories may also include additional symbols for particular functions.
Many of the well studied arithmetic theories are weak regarding proof of totality for some more fast growing functions. Some of the most basic examples of arithmetics include elementary function arithmetic , which includes induction for just bounded arithmetical formulas, here meaning with quantifiers over finite number ranges.
The -induction schema for arithmetical existential formulas allows for induction for those properties of naturals a validation of which is computable via a finite search with unbound (any, but finite) runtime. The schema is also classically equivalent to the -induction schema.
The relatively weak classical first-order arithmetic which adopts that schema is denoted  and proves the primitive recursive functions total. The theory  is -conservative over primitive recursive arithmetic .
Note that the -induction is also part of the second-order reverse mathematics base system , its other axioms being  plus -comprehension of subsets of naturals. Those last mentioned arithmetic theories all have ordinal .

Let us mention one more step beyond the -induction schema. Lack of stronger induction schemas means, for example, that some infinite versions of the pigeon hole principle are unprovable. (In the classical context and in terms of sets, this claim about coloring may be phrased positively, as saying that there always exists at least one return value  such that, in effect, for some infinite domain  it holds that . When read constructively, one would want  to be concretely specifiable and so that formulation is a stronger claim.) Higher indirection, than in induction for mere existential statements, is needed to formally reformulate such a negation (the Ramsey theorem type claim in the original formulation above) and prove it. Namely to restate the problem in terms of the negation of the existence of one joint threshold number, depending on all the hypothetical 's, beyond which the function would still have to attain some color value.
For properties in terms of return values of functions on finite domains, brute force verification through checking all possible inputs has computational overhead which is larger the larger the size of the domain, but always finite. Acceptance of an induction schema as in  validates the former so called infinite pigeon hole principle, which concerns unbounded domains, and so is about mappings with infinitely many inputs.

It is worth noting that in the program of predicative arithmetic, even the mathematical induction schema has been criticized as possibly being impredicative, when natural numbers are defined as the object which fulfill this schema, which itself is defined in terms of all naturals.

Exponentiation 
Classical  without the Powerset axiom is still consistent with all existing sets of reals being subcountable, and there even countable. Possible choice principles were discussed, a weakened form of the Separation schema was already adopted, and more of the standard  axioms shall be weakened for a more predicative and constructive theory. The first one of those is the Powerset axiom, which is adopted in the form of the space of characteristic functions, itself tied to exactly the decidable subclasses. So consider the axiom .

The formulation here uses the convenient notation for function spaces. Otherwise the axiom is lengthier, characterizing  using bounded quantifiers in the total function predicate.
In words, the axiom says that given two sets , the class  of all functions is, in fact, also a set.
This is certainly required, for example, to formalize the object map of an internal hom-functor like .

Existence statements like Exponentiation, i.e. function spaces being sets, enable the derivation of more sets via bounded Separation. Adopting the axiom, quantification  over the elements of certain classes of functions only ranges over a set, also when such function spaces are even classically uncountable. E.g. the collection of all functions  where , i.e. the set  of points underlying the Cantor space, is uncountable, by Cantor's diagonal argument, and can at best be taken to be a subcountable set. (In this section and beyond, the symbol for the semiring of natural numbers in expressions like  is used, or written , just to avoid conflation of cardinal- with ordinal exponentiation.) Roughly, classically uncountable sets tend to not have computably decidable equality.

On countable sets 
Enumerable forms of the pigeon hole principle can now be proven, e.g. that on a finitely enumerable set, every injection is also a surjection. At last, all finitely enumerable sets are finite. The finitely enumerable union of a family of subfinite resp. subcountable sets is itself subfinite resp. subcountable.

For any countable family of counting functions together with their ranges, the theory proves the union of those ranges to be countable. With Exponentiation, the union of all finite sequences over a countable set is now a countable set.

With function spaces with the finite von Neumann ordinals as domains, we can model  as discussed and can thus encode ordinals in the arithmetic. Relatedly, the set theory then also proves the existence of any primitive recursive function on the naturals , as set functions in the uncountable set .

As far as comprehension goes, the dependent or indexed products  are now sets. The theory now proves the collection of all the countable subsets of any set (the collection is a subclass of the powerclass) to be a set.

The class of subsets of a set 
The characterization of the class  of all subsets of a set  involves unbounded universal quantification, namely . So in a mathematical set theory framework, the power class is defined not in a bottom-up construction from its constituents (like an algorithm on a list, that e.g. maps ) but via a comprehension over all sets.

The richness of the powerclass in a theory without excluded middle can best be understood by considering small classically finite sets. Consider three different undecidable proposition, none of which provenly imply another. They can ben used to define three subclasses of the singleton , none of which are provenly the same.
The set  of -valued functions on a set  injects into the function space  and corresponds to just its decidable subsets.

Whether also  is true in a theory is contingent on a simple disjunction:
.
So assuming  for just bounded formulas, predicative Separation then lets one demonstrate that the powerclass  is a set.
With exponentiation,  being a set already implies Powerset for sets in general.
So in this context, also full Choice proves Powerset.
See also .

Assuming full Separation, both full Choice and Regularity prove .

Relatedly, assuming  in this theory, Set induction becomes equivalent to Regularity and Replacement becomes capable of proving full Separation.

Metalogic
While the theory  does not exceed the consistency strength of Heyting arithmetic, adding Excluded Middle gives a theory proving the same theorems as classical  minus Regularity!
Thus, adding Regularity as well as either  or full Separation to  gives full classical .
Adding full Choice and full Separation gives  minus Regularity.

So this would thus lead to a theory beyond the strength of typical type theory.

Category and type theoretic notions 
So in this context with Exponentiation, function spaces are more accessible than classes of subsets, as is the case with exponential objects resp. subobjects in category theory.
In category theoretical terms, the theory  essentially corresponds to constructively well-pointed Cartesian closed Heyting pretoposes with (whenever Infinity is adopted) a natural numbers object. Existence of powerset is what would turn a Heyting pretopos into an elementary topos.
Every such topos that interprets  is of course a model of these weaker theories, but locally Cartesian closed pretoposes have been defined that e.g. interpret theories with Exponentiation but reject full Separation and Powerset.
A form of  corresponds to any subobject having a complement, in which case we call the topos Boolean. Diaconescu's theorem in its original topos form says that this hold iff any coequalizer of two nonintersecting monomorphisms has a section. The latter is a formulation of choice. Barr's theorem states that any topos admits a surjection from a Boolean topos onto it, relating to classical statements being provable intuitionistically.

In type theory, the expression "" exists on its own and denotes function spaces, a primitive notion.
A typical type theory with general programming capability - and certainly those that can model , which is considered a constructive set theory - will have a type of integers and function spaces representing , and as such also include types that are not countable. This is just to say, or implies, that among the function terms , none have the property of being a bijection.

Constructive set theories are also studied in the context of applicative axioms.

Analysis 
For context, possible further principles are mentioned, which are not necessarily classical and also not generally considered constructive.
Here a general warning is in order: When reading proposition equivalence claims in the computable context, one shall always be aware which choice, induction and comprehension principles are silently assumed.
See also the related constructive analysis, feasible analysis and computable analysis.

Cauchy sequences 
So this enables speaking of Cauchy sequences and their arithmetic.

Cauchy reals 
More axioms are required to always grant completeness of equivalence classes of such sequences and strong principles need to be postulated to imply the existence of a modulus of convergence for all Cauchy sequences. Weak countable choice is generally the context for proving uniqueness of the Cauchy reals as complete (pseudo-)ordered field. The prefix "pseudo" here highlights that the order will, in any case, constructively not always be decidable.

Towards the Dedekind reals 
As in the classical theory, Dedekind cuts are characterized using subsets of algebraic structures such as : The properties of being inhabited, numerically bounded above, "closed downwards" and "open upwards" are all bounded formulas with respect to the given set underlying the algebraic structure. A standard example of a cut, the first component indeed exhibiting these properties, is the representation of  given by

(Depending on the convention for cuts, either of the two parts or neither, like here, may makes use of the sign .)

The theory given by the axioms so far validates that a pseudo-ordered field that is also Archimedean and Dedekind complete, if it exists at all, is in this way characterized uniquely, up to isomorphism.
However, the existence of just function spaces such as  does not grant  to be a set, and so neither is the class of all subsets of  that do fulfill the named properties.
What is required for the class of Dedekind reals to be a set is an axiom regarding existence of a set of subsets and this is discussed further below in the section on Binary refinement.
In a context without  or Powerset, countable choice into finite sets is commonly assumed to prove the uncountability of the Dedekind reals.

Whether Cauchy or Dedekind reals, fewer statements about the arithmetic of the reals are decidable, compared to the classical theory.

Constructive schools 
Non-constructive claims valuable in the study of constructive analysis are commonly formulated as concerning all binary sequences, i.e. functions . In the context of Exponentiation, such proposition are now set-bound.

A most prominent example is the limited principle of omniscience , postulating a disjunctive property, like  at the level of -sentences or functions. (Example functions can be constructed in raw  such that, if  is consistent, the competing disjuncts are -unprovable.) The principle is independent of e.g.  introduced below. Mention of such principles holding for -sentences generally hint at equivalent formulations in terms of sequences, deciding apartness of reals. In a constructive analysis context with countable choice,  is e.g. equivalent to the claim that every real is either rational or irrational - again without the requirement to witness either disjunct. The three omniscience principles are each equivalent to theorems of the apartness, equality or order of two reals in this way.

Here a list of some propositions employed in theories of constructive analysis that are not provable using just base intuitionistic logic.
For example, see  or even the anti-classical constructive Church's thesis principle  for number-theoretic functions as a postulate in the theory, or some of its consequences on the recursive mathematics side (variously called ,  or ). On another end, there are Kripke's schema (turning all subclasses of  countable), bar induction, the decidable fan theorem  (which contradicts strong forms of Church's thesis), or even Brouwer's anti-classical continuity principle determining functions on unending sequences through finite initial segments, on the Brouwerian intuitionist side. Both mentioned schools contradict , so that choosing to adopt certain of its laws makes the theory inconsistent with theorems in classical analysis. Those two schools are moreover not consistent with one another.

The predicate expressing a program to be total is famously computably undecidable. Church's thesis principle, expressed in the language of the theory, concerns those set functions and it postulates that they corresponds to computable programs. Which is to say it is still a subclass of the naturals and so this is, when put in relation to some classical function spaces, a conceptually small class. In this sense, adopting  postulate makes  into a "sparse" set, as viewed from classical set theory. Subcountability of sets can also be postulated independently.

Infinite trees 
Through the relation between computability and the arithmetical hierarchy, insights in this classical study are also revealing for constructive considerations. A basic insight of reverse mathematics concerns computable infinite finitely branching binary trees. Such a tree may e.g. be encoded as an infinite set of finite sets
,
with decidable membership, and those trees then provenly contain elements of arbitrary big finite size. In reverse mathematics, the second-order arithmetic  does not prove . To understand this, note that there are computable trees  for which no computable such path through it exists. To prove this, one enumerates the partial computable sequences and then diagonalizes all total computable sequences in one partial computable sequences . One can then roll out a certain tree , one exactly compatible with the still possible values of  everywhere, which by construction is incompatible with any total computable path.

In , the principle  implies the non-constructive lesser limited principle of omniscience . In a more conservative context, they are equivalent assuming - (a very weak countable choice). It is also equivalent to the Brouwer fixed point theorem and other theorems regarding values of continuous functions on the reals. The fixed point theorem in turn implies the intermediate value theorem, but be aware that the classical theorems can translate to different variants when expressed in a constructive context.

The  concerns infinite graphs and so its contrapositive gives a condition for finiteness. Over , they are actually equivalent. In  those are distinct, but, after again assuming some choice, here then  implies .

Induction

Mathematical induction 
In set language, induction principles can read , with the antecedent  defined as further above, and with  meaning  where  is always the set of naturals. Via the strong axiom of Infinity and bounded Separation, the validity of induction for bounded definitions was already established.

At this point it is instructive to recall how set comprehension was encoding statements in predicate logic. For an example, given set , let  denote the existential statement that a certain function space set exist, . Here the existential quantifier is not merely one over natural numbers or bounded by any other set. Now a proposition like this exponentiation claim, the claim  and the subclass claim  are just two ways of formulating the same desired statement, namely an -indexed conjunction of existential propositions where  spans over the set of all naturals. The second form is expressed using class notation involving a subclass comprehension that may not constitute a set, in which case many set axioms will not apply, so that establishing it as a theorem may not be possible. A set theory with just bounded Separation can thus also be strengthened by adopting arithmetical induction schemas for predicates beyond just the bounded ones.

The iteration principle for set functions mentioned in the section dedicated to arithmetic is also implied by the full induction schema over one's structure modeling the naturals (e.g. ). So for that theorem, granting a model of Heyting arithmetic, it represents an alternative to Exponentiation.
The schema is often formulated in terms of predicates as follows:

Here formulas in schemas are to be understood as formulas in first-order set theory, as emphasized in the section on induction in arithmetic. As in the classical theory, the full induction schema is implied by the full Separation schema.
And as stated in the section on Choice, induction principles are also implied by various forms of choice principles.

Set Induction 
Full Set Induction in  proves induction in transitive sets and so in particular also for transitive sets of transitive sets. The latter is an adequate definition of the ordinals, and even a -formulation. Induction in turn enables ordinal arithmetic in this sense.
In particular, it proves full mathematical induction. Replacement is not required to prove induction over the set of naturals, but it is for their arithmetic modeled within the set theory.

It then reads as follows:

Here  holds trivially and so this covers to the "bottom case"  in the standard framework.
The variant of the axiom just for bounded formulas is also studied independently and may be derived from other axioms.

The axiom allows definitions of class functions by transfinite recursion. The study of the various principles that grant set definitions by induction, i.e. inductive definitions, is a main topic in the context of constructive set theory and their comparatively weak strengths. This also holds for their counterparts in type theory.

The axiom of regularity is a single statement with universal quantifier over sets and not a schema. As show, it implies , and so is non-constructive. Now for  taken to be the negation of some predicate  and writing  for the class , induction reads

Via the contrapositive, set induction implies all instances of regularity but only with double-negated existence in the conclusion. In the other direction, given enough transitive sets, regularity implies each instance of set induction.

Metalogic
This now covers variants of all of the eight Zermelo–Fraenkel axioms. Extensionality, Pairing, Union and Replacement are indeed identical. Infinity is stated in a strong formulation and implies Emty Set, as in the classical case. Separation, classically stated redundantly, is constructively not implied by Replacement. Without the Law of Excluded Middle, the theory here is lacking, in its classical form, full Separation, Powerset as well as Regularity. Adding  at this point would already give . Replacement and Exponentiation can be further strengthened without losing a type theoretical interpretation and in a way that is not going beyond . Those two alterations are discussed next.

Like the axiom of regularity, set induction restricts the possible models of the membership relation "" and thus that of a set theory, as was the motivation for the principle in the 20's.
The added proof-theoretical strength attained with Induction in the constructive context is significant, even if dropping Regularity in the context of  does not reduce the proof-theoretical strength.
Aczel was also one of the main developers or Non-well-founded set theory, which rejects this last axiom.

Strong Collection 
Induction for unbound predicates proves that these sets exist for all of the infinitely many naturals. Replacement "for " now moreover states that this infinite class of products can be turned into the infinite set, . This is also not a subset of any previously established set.

Going beyond those axioms also seen in Myhill's typed approach, consider the discussed constructive theory with Exponentiation and Induction, but now strengthened by the collection schema. This is an alternative to the Replacement schema and indeed supersedes it, due to not requiring the binary relation definition to be functional, but possibly multi-valued. The principle may be used in the constructive study of larger sets beyond the everyday need of analysis.

The axiom concerns a property for relations, giving rise to a somewhat repetitive format in its first-order formulation. The antecedent states that one considers relation  between sets  and  that are total over a certain domain set , that is,  has at least one "image value"  for every element  in the domain. This is more general than an inhabitance condition  in a choice axiom, but also more general than the condition of Replacement, which demands unique existence . In the consequent, firstly, the axioms states that then there exists a set  which contains at least one "image" value  under , for every element of the domain. Secondly, in this axioms formulation it then moreover states that only such images  are elements of that new codomain set . The axiom may be expressed as saying that for every total relation, there exists a set  such that the relation is total in both directions.

Metalogic
This theory without , without unbounded separation and without "naive" Power set enjoys various nice properties.

Constructive Zermelo–Fraenkel

Subset Collection
One may approach Power set further without losing a type theoretical interpretation.
It is by adopting the following alternative, which can again be seen as a constructive version of the Power set axiom:

An alternative that is not a schema is elaborated on below.

Fullness
This class is given as

One does not postulate  to be a set, since with Replacement one can use this collection of relations between a set  and the finite , i.e. the "bi-valued functions on ", to extract the set  of all its subsets. In other words  being a set would imply the Powerset axiom.

Over , there is a single, somewhat clearer alternative axiom to the Subset Collection schema.

On a given domain , the functions are exactly the sparsest total relations, namely the unique valued ones. Therefore, the axiom implies that there is a set such that all functions are in it. In this way, Fullness implies Exponentiation.
The Fullness axiom is in turn also implied by the so-called Presentation Axiom about sections, which can also be formulated category theoretically.

Binary refinement
The so called binary refinement axiom says that for any  there exists a set  such that for any covering , the set  holds two subsets  and  that also do this covering job, . It is a weakest form of the powerset axiom and at the core of some important mathematical proofs.
Fullness for relations between the set  and the finite  implies that this is indeed possible.

Taking another step back,  plus Recursion and plus Binary refinement already proves that there exists an Archimedean, Dedekind complete pseudo-ordered field. That set theory also proves that the class of left Dedekind cuts is a set, not requiring Induction or Collection. And it moreover proves that function spaces into discrete sets are sets (there e.g. ), without assuming . Already over the weak theory  (which is to say without Infinity) does binary refinement prove that function spaces into discrete sets are sets, and therefore e.g. the existence of all characteristic function spaces .

Unprovable claims
The bounded notion of a transitive sets of transitive sets is a good way to define ordinals and enables induction on ordinals. Also, neither linearity of ordinals, nor existence of power sets of finite sets are derivable in this theory, as assuming either implies Power set. The circumstance that ordinals are better behaved in the classical than in the constructive context manifests in a different theory of large set existence postulates.

The theory  does not prove that all function spaces formed from sets in the constructible universe  are sets inside , and this holds even when assuming Powerset instead of the weaker Exponentiation axiom.

Metalogic
This theory has the numerical existence property and the disjunctive property, but there are concessions:  lacks the existence property due to the Subset Schema or Fullness axiom. The existence property is not lacking when the weaker Exponentiation or the stronger but impredicative Powerset axiom axiom is adopted instead. The latter is in general lacking a constructive interpretation.

This is done in terms of images of its functions as well as a fairly direct constructive and predicative justification, while retaining the language of set theory. Conversely,  interprets .
All statements validated in the subcountable model of the set theory can be proven exactly via  plus the choice principle -, stated further above.
Exhibiting a type theoretical model, the theory  has modest proof theoretic strength, the Bachmann–Howard ordinal (see also ). Those theories with choice have the existence property for a broad class of sets in common mathematics.
Martin-Löf type theories with additional induction principles validate corresponding set theoretical axioms.

Breaking with ZF
One may further add the anti-classical claim that all sets are subcountable, as is the case in the type theoretical model, as an axiom. By Infinity and Exponentiation,  is an uncountable set, while the class  or even  is then provenly not a set, by Cantor's diagonal argument.
Subcountability is also in contradiction with various large set axioms.

The theory  may be studied by also adding back the -induction schema or relativized dependent choice, as well as the assertion that every set is member of a transitive set.

Intuitionistic Zermelo–Fraenkel
As such,  can be seen as the most straight forward variant of  without .

While the axiom of replacement requires the relation  to be functional over the set  (as in, for every  in  there is associated exactly one ), the Axiom of Collection does not.
It merely requires there be associated at least one , and it asserts the existence of a set which collects at least one such  for each such .
In classical , the Collection schema implies the Axiom schema of replacement. When making use of Powerset (and only then), they can be shown to be classically equivalent.

While  is based on intuitionistic rather than classical logic, it is considered impredicative.
It allows formation of sets using the Axiom of Separation with any proposition, including ones which contain quantifiers which are not bounded. Thus new sets can be formed in terms of the universe of all sets, distancing the theory from the bottom-up constructive perspective. With this general Separation, it is easy to define sets  with undecidable membership, namely by making use of undecidable predicates defined on a set.
Further, the power set axiom implies the existence of a set of truth values. In the presence of excluded middle, this set has two elements. In the absence of it, the set of truth values is also considered impredicative. In fact, it is ready implied by the particular formula , the principle that knowledge of membership of  shall always be decidable, no matter the set.

Metalogic
As implied above, the subcountability property cannot be adopted for all sets, given the theory proves  to be a set.
The theory has many of the nice numerical existence properties and is e.g. consistent with Church's thesis principle as well as with  being subcountable. It also has the disjunctive property.

 with Replacement instead of Collection has the general existence property, even when adopting relativized dependent choice on top of it all. but  as formulated does not. The combination of schemas including full separation spoils it.

Intuitionistic Z
Again on the weaker end, as with its historical counterpart Zermelo set theory, one may denote by  the intuitionistic theory set up like  but without Replacement, Collection or Induction.

Intuitionistic KP
Let us mention another very weak theory that has been investigated, namely Intuitionistic (or constructive) Kripke–Platek set theory .
The theory has not only Separation but also Collection restricted to -formulas, i.e. it is similar to  but with Induction instead of full Replacement.
It is especially weak when studied without Infinity.
The theory does not fit into the hierarchy as presented above, simply because it has Axiom schema of Set Induction from the start. This enables theorems involving the class of ordinals.

Sorted theories

Constructive set theory
As he presented it, Myhill's system  is a theory using constructive first-order logic with identity and three sorts, namely
sets, natural numbers, functions. Its axioms are:
 The usual Axiom of Extensionality for sets, as well as one for functions, and the usual Axiom of union.
 The Axiom of restricted, or predicative, separation, which is a weakened form of the Separation axiom from classical set theory, requiring that any quantifications be bounded to another set, as discussed.
 A form of the Axiom of Infinity asserting that the collection of natural numbers (for which he introduces a constant ) is in fact a set.
 The axiom of Exponentiation, asserting that for any two sets, there is a third set which contains all (and only) the functions whose domain is the first set, and whose range is the second set. This is a greatly weakened form of the Axiom of power set in classical set theory, to which Myhill, among others, objected on the grounds of its impredicativity.

And furthermore:
 The usual Peano axioms for natural numbers.
 Axioms asserting that the domain and range of a function are both sets. Additionally, an Axiom of non-choice asserts the existence of a choice function in cases where the choice is already made. Together these act like the usual Replacement axiom in classical set theory.

One can roughly identify the strength of this theory with a constructive subtheories of  when comparing with the previous sections.

And finally the theory adopts
 An Axiom of dependent choice, which is much weaker than the usual Axiom of choice.

Bishop style set theory
Set theory in the flavor of Errett Bishop's constructivist school mirrors that of Myhill, but is set up in a way that sets come equipped with relations that govern their discreteness.
Commonly, Dependent Choice is adopted.

A lot of analysis and module theory has been developed in this context.

Category theories
Not all formal logic theories of sets need to axiomize the binary membership predicate "" directly. A theory like the Elementary Theory of the Categories Of Set, e.g. capturing pairs of composable mappings between objects, can also be expressed with a constructive background logic. Category theory can be set up as a theory of arrows and objects, although first-order axiomatizations only in terms of arrows are possible.

Beyond that, topoi also have internal languages that can be intuitionistic themselves and capture a notion of sets.

Good models of constructive set theories in category theory are the pretoposes mentioned in the Exponentiation section. For some good set theory, this may require enough projectives, an axiom about surjective "presentations" of set, implying Countable Dependent Choice.

See also

 Axiom schema of predicative separation
 Constructive mathematics
 Constructive analysis
 Constructive Church's thesis rule and principle
 Computable set
 Existence Property
 Diaconescu's theorem
 Epsilon-induction
 Hereditarily finite set
 Heyting arithmetic
 Impredicativity
 Intuitionistic type theory
 Law of excluded middle
 Ordinal analysis
 Subcountability

References

Further reading 
 
 Aczel, P. and Rathjen, M. (2001). Notes on constructive set theory. Technical Report 40, 2000/2001. Mittag-Leffler Institute, Sweden.

External links 
 Laura Crosilla, Set Theory: Constructive and Intuitionistic ZF, Stanford Encyclopedia of Philosophy, Feb 20, 2009
 Benno van den Berg, Constructive set theory – an overview, slides from Heyting dag, Amsterdam, 7 September 2012

Constructivism (mathematics)
Intuitionism
Systems of set theory